Ernest Walmsley (12 August 1887 – 8 May 1970) was a British diver. He competed in the men's 3 metre springboard event at the 1920 Summer Olympics.

References

External links
 

1887 births
1970 deaths
British male divers
Olympic divers of Great Britain
Divers at the 1920 Summer Olympics
Place of birth missing